This article gives a sketch of a proof of Gödel's first incompleteness theorem. This theorem applies to any formal theory that satisfies certain technical hypotheses, which are discussed as needed during the sketch. We will assume for the remainder of the article that a fixed theory satisfying these hypotheses has been selected.

Throughout this article the word "number" refers to a natural number.  The key property these numbers possess is that any natural number can be obtained by starting with the number 0 and adding 1 a finite number of times.

Hypotheses of the theory 
Gödel's theorem applies to any formal theory that satisfies certain properties. Each formal theory has a signature that specifies the nonlogical symbols in the language of the theory.  For simplicity, we will assume that the language of the theory is composed from the following collection of 15 (and only 15) symbols:

 A constant symbol  for zero.
 A unary function symbol  for the successor operation and two binary function symbols + and × for addition and multiplication.
 Three symbols for logical conjunction, disjunction, and negation, ¬.
 Two symbols for universal, and existential, quantifiers.
 Two symbols for binary relations, = and <, for equality and order (less than).
 Two symbols for left,  and right,  parentheses for establishing precedence of quantifiers.
 A single variable symbol,  and a distinguishing symbol  that can be used to construct additional variables of the form x*, x**, x***, ...

This is the language of Peano arithmetic.  A well-formed formula is a sequence of these symbols that is formed so as to have a well-defined reading as a mathematical formula. Thus   is well formed while  is not well formed. A theory is a set of well-formed formulas with no free variables.

A theory is consistent if there is no formula  such that both  and its negation are provable.  ω-consistency is a stronger property than consistency.  Suppose that  is a formula with one free variable .  In order to be ω-consistent,  the theory cannot prove both  while also proving  for each natural number .

The theory is assumed to be effective, which means that the set of axioms must be recursively enumerable.  This means that it is theoretically possible to write a finite-length computer program that, if allowed to run forever, would output the axioms of the theory (necessarily including every well-formed instance of the axiom schema of induction) one at a time and not output anything else. This requirement is necessary; there are theories that are complete, consistent, and include elementary arithmetic, but no such theory can be effective.

Outline of the proof 

 For a simplified outline of the proof, see Gödel's incompleteness theorems

The sketch here is broken into three parts.  In the first part, each formula of the theory is assigned a number, known as a Gödel number, in a manner that allows the formula to be effectively recovered from the number. This numbering is extended to cover finite sequences of formulas. In the second part, a specific formula  is constructed such that for any two numbers  and  holds if and only if  represents a sequence of formulas that constitutes a proof of the formula that  represents.  In the third part of the proof, we construct a self-referential formula that, informally, says "I am not provable", and prove that this sentence is neither provable nor disprovable within the theory.

Importantly, all the formulas in the proof can be defined by primitive recursive functions, which themselves can be defined in first-order Peano arithmetic.

Gödel numbering 

The first step of the proof is to represent (well-formed) formulas of the theory, and finite lists of these formulas, as natural numbers. These numbers are called the Gödel numbers of the formulas.

Begin by assigning a natural number to each symbol of the language of arithmetic, similar to the manner in which the ASCII code assigns a unique binary number to each letter and certain other characters. This article will employ the following assignment, very similar to the one Douglas Hofstadter used in his Gödel, Escher, Bach:

The Gödel number of a formula is obtained by concatenating the Gödel numbers of each symbol making up the formula. Hence any formula may be correctly recovered from its Gödel number. Let  denote the Gödel number of the formula .

Given the above Gödel numbering, the sentence asserting that addition commutes,  translates as the number:

 

(Spaces have been inserted on each side of every 0 only for readability; Gödel numbers are strict concatenations of decimal digits.)  Not all natural numbers represent a formula. For example, the number

 

translates to "", which is not well-formed.

Because each natural number can be obtained by applying the successor operation  to  a finite number of times, every natural number has its own Gödel number.

 .

The assignment of Gödel numbers can be extended to finite lists of formulas. To obtain the Gödel number of a list of formulas, write the Gödel numbers of the formulas in order, separating them by two consecutive zeros. Since the Gödel number of a formula never contains two consecutive zeros, each formula in a list of formulas can be effectively recovered from the Gödel number for the list.

It is crucial that the formal arithmetic be capable of proving a minimum set of facts. In particular, it must be able to prove that every number  has a Gödel number . This is a uniform procedure.

The provability relation 

Deduction rules can then be represented by binary relations on Gödel numbers of lists of formulas. In other words, suppose that there is a deduction rule , by which one can move from the formulas  to a new formula . Because each deduction rule is concrete, it is possible to effectively determine for any natural numbers  and  whether they are related by the relation.

The second stage in the proof is to use the Gödel numbering, described above, to show that the notion of provability can be expressed within the formal language of the theory. Suppose the theory has deduction rules:  . Let  be their corresponding relations, as described above.

Every provable statement is either an axiom itself, or it can be deduced from the axioms by a finite number of applications of the deduction rules. 
Thus one can define the Gödel number of a proof.

 is in fact an arithmetical relation, just as "" is, though a (much) more complicated one. This is because the relation between these two numbers can be simply "checked". Formally this can be proven by induction, where all these possible relations (whose number is infinite) are constructed one by one.
The detailed construction of the formula  makes essential use of the assumption that the theory is effective; it would not be possible to construct this formula without such an assumption.

Self-referential formula 

Any proof of  can be encoded by a Gödel number , such that  does not hold. In other words, a formula about natural numbers, corresponds to "there is no proof of ".

We now define the formula , where  is a free variable. The formula  itself has a Gödel number  as does every formula.

This formula has a free variable .
the Gödel number of a formula , where  is a free variable. Then,  corresponds to "there is no proof of ", as we have seen.

Consider the formula . This formula concerning the number  corresponds to "there is no proof of ". We have here the self-referential feature that is crucial to the proof: A formula of the formal theory that somehow relates to its own provability within that formal theory. Very informally,  says: "I am not provable".

We will now show that neither the formula , nor its negation ,  is provable.

Suppose  is provable. Then, as seen earlier, the formula   is provable. Proving both  and  violates the consistency of the formal theory. We therefore conclude that  is not provable.

Consider any number . Suppose  is provable.
But we have just proved that  is not provable. Since either  or  must be provable, we conclude that, for all natural numbers  is provable.

Thus if the theory is ω-consistent,  is not provable.

We have sketched a proof showing that:

For any formal, recursively enumerable (i.e. effectively generated) theory of Peano Arithmetic,

 if it is consistent, then there exists an unprovable formula (in the language of that theory).

 if it is ω-consistent, then there exists a formula such that both it and its negation are unprovable.

The truth of the Gödel sentence 

This makes no appeal to whether  is "true", only to whether it is provable. Truth is a model-theoretic, or semantic, concept, and is not equivalent to provability except in special cases.

As just seen,  is provable for each natural number , and is thus true in the model . Therefore, within this model,

 

holds. This is what the statement " is true" usually refers to—the sentence is true in the intended model.  It is not true in every model, however: If it were, then by Gödel's completeness theorem it would be provable, which we have just seen is not the case.

Boolos's short proof 

George Boolos (1989) vastly simplified the proof of the First Theorem, if one agrees that the theorem is equivalent to:
"There is no algorithm  whose output contains all true sentences of arithmetic and no false ones."
"Arithmetic" refers to Peano or Robinson arithmetic, but the proof invokes no specifics of either, tacitly assuming that these systems allow '<' and '×' to have their usual meanings. Boolos proves the theorem in about two pages. His proof employs the language of first-order logic, but invokes no facts about the connectives or quantifiers. The domain of discourse is the natural numbers. The Gödel sentence builds on Berry's paradox.

Boolos then asserts (the details are only sketched) that there exists a defined predicate  that comes out true iff an arithmetic formula containing  symbols names the number . This proof sketch contains the only mention of Gödel numbering; Boolos merely assumes that every formula can be so numbered. Here, a formula names the number  iff the following is provable:

 

Boolos then defines the related predicates:

 . (English:  comes out true if  can be defined in fewer than  symbols):
 . (English:  comes out true if  is the smallest number not definable in fewer than  symbols. More awkwardly,  holds if  cannot be defined in fewer than  symbols, and all numbers less than  can be defined using fewer than  symbols);

 formalizes Berry's paradox. The balance of the proof, requiring but 12 lines of text, shows that the sentence  is true for some number , but no algorithm  will identify it as true. Hence in arithmetic, truth outruns proof. QED.

The above predicates contain the only existential quantifiers appearing in the entire proof. The '<' and '×' appearing in these predicates are the only defined arithmetical notions the proof requires. The proof nowhere mentions recursive functions or any facts from number theory, and Boolos claims that his proof dispenses with diagonalization. For more on this proof, see Berry's paradox.

References 
 1931, "Über formal unentscheidbare Sätze der Principia Mathematica und verwandter Systeme, I." Monatshefte für Mathematik und Physik 38: 173–98.
 English translations of the preceding:
Jean van Heijenoort, 1967. From Frege to Gödel: A Source Book on Mathematical Logic. Harvard University Press: 596–616.
 Hirzel, Martin (trans.), 2000, "On formally undecidable propositions of Principia Mathematica and related systems I.".
 1951, "Some basic theorems on the foundations of mathematics and their implications" in Solomon Feferman, ed., 1995. Collected works / Kurt Gödel, Vol. III.  Oxford University Press: 304–23.
 George Boolos, 1998, "A New Proof of the Gödel Incompleteness Theorem" in Boolos, G., Logic, Logic, and Logic. Harvard Univ. Press.

Citations

External links

 A concise proof of Gödel's Incompleteness Theorem.

Mathematical logic
Mathematical proofs